The College of Agricultural and Environmental Sciences (CAES) is the agricultural college of the University of Georgia, a public research university in Athens, Georgia.

History
Originally the state agricultural college, CAES was founded in 1859 by the University Board of Trustees as part of a complete reorganization of the university. It was the first college at the University of Georgia to accept women, beginning in 1918. There are three main campuses—Athens, Tifton, and Griffin. All three campuses are home to various research stations and extension programs. The main Athens campus buildings are Conner Hall, the Edgar Rhodes Center for Animal and Dairy Sciences and the Four Towers Building. Off-campus sites include barns on South Milledge Avenue, the UGA Teaching Dairy, Double Bridges Farm, the UGA Livestock Teaching Arena, and the Wilkins Beef Unit. Additional research centers are located in Attapulgus, Eatonton, Camilla, Savannah, Blairsville, Calhoun, and Plains. Georgia's Agricultural Extension has programs in 157 of Georgia's 159 counties and five 4-H centers for youth that are located in Hampton, Jekyll Island, Eatonton, Tybee Island, and Dahlonega.

Departments
The following departments are part of CAES:
 Agricultural and Applied Economics (Department Head: Octavio Ramirez)
 Agricultural Leadership, Education and Communication (Department Head: Jennifer H Waldeck)
 Animal and Dairy Science (Department Head: Francis Fluharty)
 Crop and Soil Sciences (Department Head: Tim Grey (Interim))
 Entomology (Department Head: S. Kris Braman)
 Food Science and Technology (Department Head: Manpreet Singh (Interim))
 Horticulture (Department Head: Leo Lombardini)
 Plant Pathology (Department Head: Harald Scherm)
 Poultry Science (Department Head: Todd Applegate)

References

External links
 

Agricultural and Environmental Sciences
Georgia
Educational institutions established in 1859
1859 establishments in Georgia (U.S. state)